In the mathematical field of integral geometry, the Funk transform (also known as Minkowski–Funk transform, Funk–Radon transform or spherical Radon transform) is an integral transform defined by integrating a function on great circles of the sphere. It is closely related to the Radon transform. The original motivation for studying the Funk transform was to describe Zoll metrics on the sphere.

Definition 
The Funk transform is defined as follows.  Let ƒ be a continuous function on the 2-sphere S2 in R3.  Then, for a unit vector x, let

where the integral is carried out with respect to the arclength ds of the great circle C(x) consisting of all unit vectors perpendicular to x:

Inversion 
The Funk transform annihilates all odd functions, and so it is natural to confine attention to the case when ƒ is even.  In that case, the Funk transform takes even (continuous) functions to even continuous functions, and is furthermore invertible.

Spherical harmonics 
Every square-integrable function  on the sphere can be decomposed into spherical harmonics 

Then the Funk transform of f reads

where  for odd values and 
 
for even values.

Helgason's inversion formula 
As with the Radon transform, the inversion formula relies on the dual transform F* defined by

This is the average value of the circle function ƒ over circles of arc distance p from the point x.  The inverse transform is given by

Generalization 
The classical formulation is invariant under the rotation group SO(3).  It is also possible to formulate the Funk transform in a manner that makes it invariant under the special linear group SL(3,R)  .  Suppose that ƒ is a homogeneous function of degree −2 on R3.  Then, for linearly independent vectors x and y, define a function φ by the line integral

taken over a simple closed curve encircling the origin once.  The differential form

is closed, which follows by the homogeneity of ƒ.  By a change of variables, φ satisfies

and so gives a homogeneous function of degree −1 on the exterior square of R3,

The function Fƒ : Λ2R3 → R agrees with the Funk transform when ƒ is the degree −2 homogeneous extension of a function on the sphere and the projective space associated to Λ2R3 is identified with the space of all circles on the sphere.  Alternatively, Λ2R3 can be identified with R3 in an SL(3,R)-invariant manner, and so the Funk transform F maps smooth even homogeneous functions of degree −2 on R3\{0} to smooth even homogeneous functions of degree −1 on R3\{0}.

Applications 
It is also related to intersection bodies in convex geometry. 
Let  be a star body with radial function  .
Then the intersection body IK of K has the radial function  .

See also
 Radon transform
 Spherical mean

References

.
.
.
.

 
 

Integral geometry
Integral transforms